Nash Mir (Our World) was a Menshevik weekly journal published in St. Petersburg, Russia, in January and February 1907.

References

Defunct magazines published in Russia
Defunct political magazines
Magazines established in 1907
Magazines disestablished in 1907
Magazines published in Saint Petersburg
Russian-language newspapers
Political magazines published in Russia
Weekly magazines published in Russia
Socialist magazines